U-151 may refer to one of the following German submarines:

 , the lead ship of the Type U 151 submarines; launched in 1917 and that served in the First World War until surrendered to France; sunk as target ship on 7 June 1921
 During the First World War, Germany also had this submarine with a similar name:
 , a Type UB III submarine laid down but unfinished at the end of the war; broken up incomplete in 1919
 , a Type IID submarine that served in the Second World War until scuttled on 2 May 1945; wreck broken up at later date

Submarines of Germany